The Staggering Girl is a 2019 short film directed by Luca Guadagnino. The film was produced in collaboration with Valentino creative director Pierpaolo Piccioli. It was written by Michael Mitnick and stars Julianne Moore, Mia Goth, KiKi Layne, Kyle MacLachlan, Marthe Keller and Alba Rohrwacher.

It had its world premiere at the Cannes Film Festival in the Directors Fortnight section on May 17, 2019. It was released on February 15, 2020, by Mubi.

Cast
 Julianne Moore as Francesca Moretti
 Marthe Keller as Sofia Moretti
 Mia Goth as young Sofia
 KiKi Layne as Adut
 Kyle MacLachlan as Matteo / Bruno / Angelo
 Alba Rohrwacher as Vera

Production
In January 2019, it was announced Julianne Moore, Mia Goth, KiKi Layne, Kyle MacLachlan, Marthe Keller and Alba Rohrwacher had joined the cast of the film, with Luca Guadagnino directing from a screenplay by Michael Mitnick.

Filming
Principal photography began in November 2018.

Release
The film had its world première at the Cannes Film Festival in the Directors Fortnight section on May 17, 2019. Shortly after, Mubi acquired distribution rights to the film. It was released on February 15, 2020.

Reception

References

External links

2019 short films
Italian short films
Films directed by Luca Guadagnino
2019 films
2010s Italian films